Industrial sickness is defined all over the world as "an industrial company (being a company registered for not less than five years) which has, at the end of any financial year, accumulated losses equal to, or exceeding, its entire net worth and has also suffered cash losses in such financial year and the financial year immediately preceding such financial year".

Meaning for people

Industrial sickness is a term applied to various things associated with industry that make people ill and cause them to miss work. The solutions will have to be tailored to the specific industry, and only in that way can any real effect be made on improving the health and productivity of the industrial workforce.

The key is an aggressive work-up on the health issues for a given segment of the industrial workforce, and usually broken down by type of work (which makes sense). Even as coal miners face overpowering respiratory threats, and foundry and mill workers have to confront major physical threats from large (heavy) quantities of extremely hot materials, each facet of industrial production has its hot-button health issues.

Industrial health managers need training and experience identifying and remediating conditions that present major health threats to their respective workforces. Then they can train the rest of management and can teach the workers themselves about the best way to carry out their jobs with minimum threats to their health.

Meaning for companies

According to Companies (Second Amendment) Act, 2002

"'Sick Industrial Company' means an industrial company which has

i) The Accumulated losses in any financial year equal to 50 per cent or more of its average net worth during four years immediately preceding such financial year; or

ii) Failed to repay its debts within any three consecutive quarters on demand made in writing for its repayment by a creditor or creditors of such company."

Industrial Sickness In India
Industrial sickness specially in small-scale Industry has been always a demerit for the Indian economy, because more and more industries like – cotton, Jute, Sugar, Textiles small steel and engineering industries are being affected by this sickness problem.

As per an estimate 300 units in the medium and large scale sector were either closed or were on the stage of closing in the year 1976.  About 10% of 4 lakhs unit were also reported to be ailing.  And this position also remain same in the next decades.  At the end of year 1986, the member of sick units in the portfolio of scheduled commercial banks stood at 1,47,740 involving an out standing bank credit of Rs. 4874 crores.
 Where the total number of large Industries which are sick were 637 units at the end of year 1985 increased to 714 units in the end of next year 1986.
 Likewise on the other hand the number of sick small scale units were also increased 1.18 lakhs at the end of 1985 to 1.46 lakhs at the end of 1986.
 The bank amount which was outstanding in case of large industries for the same period also increased from Rs.2,900 crores to Rs. 3287 crores at the end of year 1986
 Dues of Small Scale sector also increased from Rs.1071 crores to Rs.1306 crores at the end of the year 1986.
 Of the 147, 740 sick industrial units which contains large medium as well as small scale involving the total bank loan (credit) of Rs. 4874 at the end of the year 1986.

Causes of sickness in small scale industry
The different types of industrial sickness in Small Scale Industry (SSI) fall under two important categories.  They are as follows:

Internal causes for sickness
We can say pertaining to the factors which are within the control of management.  This sickness arises due to internal disorder in the areas justified as following:

a) Lack of Finance:  This including weak equity base, poor utilization of assets, inefficient working capital management, absence of costing & pricing, absence of planning and budgeting and inappropriate utilization or diversion of funds.

b) Bad Production Policies :  Another very important reason for sickness is wrong selection of site which is related to production, inappropriate plant & machinery, bad maintenance of Plant & Machinery, lack of quality control, lack of standard research & development and so on.

c) Marketing and Sickness : This is another part which always affects the health of any sector as well as SSI.  This including wrong demand forecasting, selection of inappropriate product mix, absence of product planning, wrong market research methods, and bad sales promotions.

d) Inappropriate Personnel Management: Another internal reason for the sickness of SSIs is inappropriate personnel management policies which includes bad wages and salary administration, bad labour relations, lack of behavioural approach causes dissatisfaction among the employees and workers.

e) Ineffective Corporate Management:  Another reason for the sickness of SSIs is ineffective or bad corporate management which includes improper corporate planning, lack of integrity in top management, lack of coordination and control etc.

External causes for sickness
a) Personnel Constraint: The first for most important reason for the sickness of small scale industries are non availability of skilled labour or manpower wages disparity in similar industry and general labour invested in the area.

b) Marketing Constraints: The second cause for the sickness is related to marketing.  The sickness arrives due to liberal licensing policies, restrain of purchase by bulk purchasers, changes in global marketing scenario, excessive tax policies by government and market recession.

c) Production Constraints:  This is another reason for the sickness which comes under external cause of sickness.  This arises due to shortage of raw material, shortage of power, fuel and high prices, import-export restrictions.

d)  Finance Constraints:  Another external cause for the sickness of SSIs is lack of finance.  This arises due to credit restrains policy, delay in disbursement of loan by govt., unfavorable investments, fear of nationalization.

e)credit squeeze initiated by the government policies.

References

 Sick Industrial Companies (Special Provisions) Act, 1985, http://legalpundits.com/Content_folder/SICKA24092008.pdf
 https://www.scribd.com/doc/19150346/Industrial-Sickness-of-India

 An article on Industrial Sickness from S. Murlidharan, http://www.thehindubusinessline.in/2004/07/15/stories/2004071500041100.htm

Further reading
 Industrial Sickness, According to information compiled by. RBI from scheduled commercial banks, as of March 31, 2001. http://indiabudget.nic.in/es2001-02/chapt2002/chap79.pdf
 F.M. Scherer and David Ross, Industrial Sickness in Private and Joint Sectors, http://isid.org.in/pdf/wp4.pdf

Secondary sector of the economy
Business failures